Schaufuss or Schaufuß is a surname. Notable people with the surname include:

Hans Joachim Schaufuß (1918-1941), German actor
Hans Hermann Schaufuß (1893-1982), German actor
Ludwig Wilhelm Schaufuss (1833–1890), German natural scientist
Peter Schaufuss (born 1949), Danish ballet dancer
Puk Schaufuss, born Liselotte Schaufuss, (born 1943), Danish actress